The Peking Field Force was a modern-armed military unit that defended the Chinese imperial capital Beijing in the last decades of the Qing dynasty (1644–1912).

The Force was founded in 1862, two years after the humiliating capture of Beijing and the sack of the Qing emperor's Summer Palace in 1860 by foreign powers at the end of the Second Opium War. After that war, high Qing officials like Zeng Guofan, Li Hongzhang, and Wenxiang (the latter a Manchu) tried to acquire advanced western weapons and to copy western military organization. Founded by Wenxiang and manned by mostly Manchu Bannermen, the soldiers most loyal to the dynasty, the Force was armed with Russian rifles and French cannon and drilled by British officers.

The "First Historical Archives of China" in Beijing hold a collection of primary documents on the Peking Field Force.

History 
The force created in 1860 and comprising entirely bannermen was 13,000 strong and had received western training and modern equipment during the period 1862-1865 though after that whilst it continued its existence further modernisation had not occured in the force and it had been left to languish

Name
The Chinese name of the battalions is Shenji ying, in which shenji means "divine mechanism" and ying either "military camp", "battalion", or "regiment". The Qing force had the same name as the Shenjiying, a Ming-era (1368–1644) military corps that specialized in training with firearms. The Ming division has been variously referred to as "Divine Mechanism Battalions", "Firearms Division", "Artillery Camp", "Shen-chi Camp", and "Firearm Brigade". or "Divine Engine Division".

The Qing army corps also named "Shenji ying" is sometimes called the "Metropolitan Field Force", but is mostly known as the "Peking Field Force", the name by which foreigners referred to it in the late nineteenth and early twentieth centuries.

See also
Military of the Qing dynasty

Notes

Works cited

 (hardcover),  (paperback).
.

.
 (hardback).  (paperback).

Military history of the Qing dynasty
Army units and formations of China
1862 establishments in China
Eight Banners